Albert Edgar Smith (October 15, 1860  – unknown), was a Major League Baseball player who played outfielder in . He played 30 games for the Boston Beaneaters.

External links

Major League Baseball outfielders
Boston Beaneaters players
Baseball players from Connecticut
19th-century baseball players
Brooklyn Grays (Interstate Association) players
1860 births
Year of death missing
People from North Haven, Connecticut